During the 1921–22 English football season, Brentford competed in the Football League Third Division South. The club improved on its debut season in the league to finish 9th, which would be its highest placing until 1929–30.

Season summary

After a torrid first season in the Football League, Archie Mitchell joined Brentford as player-manager and the club's squad was overhauled. Outgoing manager Fred Halliday stayed at Griffin Park as secretary, which allowed Mitchell to focus solely on the team. New signings Charles Alton and John Bethune bolstered the defence, half backs Charles Fisher and James Kerr came in and Thomas Elliott and Harry Morris were signed to replace the previous season's departed leading goalscorers Harry King and Reginald Boyne. Cricketer and outside forward Patsy Hendren was available for much of the season.

Brentford began the season inconsistently and hovered around mid-table, before a run of just four defeats in 17 games firmly established the club in the top six by January 1922. Forwards Harry Morris and Harry Anstiss scored the majority of the team's goals and player-manager Mitchell had dropped himself from the team in favour of Cyril Hunter in December 1921. On 11 February 1922, Freddy Capper became the first Brentford player to be sent off in a Football League match. He received his marching orders from referee Harry Curtis, who would later be appointed as Brentford's manager in 1926. Five defeats in seven matches during February and March, coupled with poor away form throughout the season, ruled out the possibility of automatic promotion, but the team finished strongly and won five of the final eight matches to finish 9th. Brentford won just one away league match during the season, which is the joint-fewest in club history.

A rare event occurred on the final day of the season at Swansea Town's Vetch Field, when Brentford were able to field just 9 men at the kick off. William Young, Harry Anstiss and Freddy Capper missed their train at Paddington and manager Archie Mitchell was pressed into service as an emergency goalkeeper.

League table

Results
Brentford's goal tally listed first.

Legend

Football League Third Division South

FA Cup

 Sources: Statto, 100 Years of Brentford, The Complete History

Playing squad 
Players' ages are as of the opening day of the 1921–22 season.

 Sources: 100 Years of Brentford, Timeless Bees, Football League Players' Records 1888 to 1939

Coaching staff

Statistics

Appearances and goals

Players listed in italics left the club mid-season.
Source: 100 Years of Brentford

Goalscorers 

Players listed in italics left the club mid-season.
Source: 100 Years of Brentford

Management

Summary

Transfers & loans 
Cricketers are not included in this list.

References 

Brentford F.C. seasons
Brentford